Pretoria is South Africa's administrative capital, serving as the seat of the executive branch of government, and as the host to all foreign embassies to South Africa.

Pretoria straddles the Apies River and extends eastward into the foothills of the Magaliesberg mountains. It has a reputation as an academic city and center of research, being home to the Tshwane University of Technology (TUT), the University of Pretoria (UP), the University of South Africa (UNISA), the Council for Scientific and Industrial Research (CSIR), and the Human Sciences Research Council. It also hosts the National Research Foundation and the South African Bureau of Standards. Pretoria was one of the host cities of the 2010 FIFA World Cup.

Pretoria is the central part of the City of Tshwane Metropolitan Municipality which was formed by the amalgamation of several former local authorities, including Bronkhorstspruit, Centurion, Cullinan, Hammanskraal and Soshanguve. Some have proposed changing the official name from Pretoria to Tshwane, which has caused some public controversy.

Pretoria is named after the Voortrekker leader Andries Pretorius, and South Africans sometimes call it the "Jacaranda City", because of the thousands of jacaranda trees planted along its streets and in its parks and gardens.

History

Pretoria was founded in 1855 by Marthinus Pretorius, a leader of the Voortrekkers, who named it after his father Andries Pretorius and chose a spot on the banks of the Apies rivier (Afrikaans for "Monkeys river") to be the new capital of the South African Republic (ZAR). The elder Pretorius had become a national hero of the Voortrekkers after his victory over Dingane and the Zulus in the Battle of Blood River in 1838. The elder Pretorius also negotiated the Sand River Convention (1852), in which the United Kingdom acknowledged the independence of the Transvaal. It became the capital of the South African Republic on 1 May 1860.

The founding of Pretoria as the capital of the South African Republic can be seen as marking the end of the Boers' settlement movements of the Great Trek.

Boer Wars

During the First Boer War, the city was besieged by Republican forces in December 1880 and March 1881. The peace treaty which ended the war was signed in Pretoria on 3 August 1881 at the Pretoria Convention.

The Second Boer War resulted in the end of the Transvaal Republic and start of British hegemony in South Africa. The city surrendered to British forces under Frederick Roberts on 5 June 1900 and the conflict was ended in Pretoria with the signing of the Peace of Vereeniging on 31 May 1902 at Melrose House.

The Pretoria Forts were built for the defence of the city just prior to the Second Boer War. Though some of these forts are today in ruins, a number of them have been preserved as national monuments.

Union of South Africa

The Boer Republics of the ZAR and the Orange River Colony were united with the Cape Colony and Natal Colony in 1910 to become the Union of South Africa. Pretoria then became the administrative capital of the whole of South Africa, with Cape Town the legislative capital and Bloemfontein served as the judicial capital. Between 1910 and 1994, the city was also the capital of the province of Transvaal. (As the capital of the ZAR, Pretoria had superseded Potchefstroom in that role.)
On 14 October 1931, Pretoria achieved official city status. When South Africa became a republic in 1961, Pretoria remained its administrative capital.

Geography

Climate

Pretoria has a subtropical monsoon climate (Köppen: Cwa) with long hot rainy summers, and short, dry and mild winters. The city experiences the typical winters of South Africa with cold, clear nights and mild to moderately warm days.

Rain is chiefly concentrated in the summer months, with drought conditions prevailing over the winter months, when frosts may be sharp. Snowfall is an extremely rare event; snowflakes were spotted in 1959, 1968 and 2012 in the city, but the city has never experienced an accumulation in its history.

During a nationwide heat wave in November 2011, Pretoria experienced temperatures that reached , unusual for that time of the year. Similar record-breaking extreme heat events also occurred in January 2013, when Pretoria experienced temperatures exceeding  on several days. The year 2014 was one of the wettest on record for the city. A total of  fell up to the end of December, with  recorded in this month alone.

Demographics

Depending on the extent of the area understood to constitute "Pretoria", the population ranges from 700,000 to 2.95 million. The main languages spoken in Pretoria are Sepedi, Setswana, Xitsonga, Afrikaans and English. The city of Pretoria has the largest white population in Sub-Saharan Africa. Since its founding, it has been a major Afrikaner population centre, and there are roughly 1 million Afrikaners living in or around the city.

Ethnic groups
Even since the end of Apartheid, Pretoria itself has had a white majority, albeit with an ever-increasing black middle-class. However, in the townships of Mamelodi, Soshanguve and Atteridgeville black people make up close to all of the population. The largest white ethnic group are the Afrikaners and the largest black ethnic group are the Northern Sothos.

The lower estimate for the population of Pretoria includes largely former white-designated areas, and there is therefore a white majority. However, including the geographically separate townships increases Pretoria's population beyond a million and makes whites a minority.

Pretoria's Indians were ordered to move from Pretoria to Laudium on 6 June 1958.

Cityscape
Pretoria is known as the "Jacaranda City" due to the approximately 50,000 Jacarandas that line its streets. Purple is a colour often associated with the city and is often included on local council logos and services such as the A Re Yeng rapid bus system and the logo of the local Jacaranda FM radio station.

Architecture

Pretoria has over the years had very diverse cultural influences and this is reflected in the architectural styles that can be found in the city. It ranges from 19th century Dutch, German and British colonial architecture to modern, postmodern, neomodern, and art deco architecture styles with a good mix of a uniquely South African style.

Some of the notable structures in Pretoria include the late 19th century Palace of Justice, the early 20th century Union Buildings, the post-war Voortrekker Monument, the diverse buildings dotting the main campuses of both the University of Pretoria and the University of South Africa, traditional Cape Dutch style Mahlamba Ndlopfu (the President's House), the more modern Reserve Bank of South Africa (office skyscraper) and the Telkom Lukasrand Tower. Other well-known structures and buildings include the Loftus Versfeld Stadium, The South African State Theatre and the Oliver Tambo building which is the Headquarters of the Department of International Relations and Cooperation.

Central business district

Despite the many corporate offices, small businesses, shops, and government departments that are situated in Pretoria's sprawling suburbs, its Central Business District still retains its status as the traditional centre of government and commerce. Many banks, businesses, large corporations, shops, shopping centres, and other businesses are situated in the city centre which is towered by several large skyscrapers, the tallest of which is the Poyntons Building ( tall), the ABSA Building ( tall) and the Reserve Bank of South Africa building ( tall).

The area contains a large number of historical buildings, monuments, and museums that include the Pretoria City Hall, Pretorius Square, Church Square (along with its many historical buildings and statues), and the Ou Raadsaal. There is also the Transvaal Museum (the country's leading natural history museum, which although it has changed venues a number of times, has been around since 1892), the National Zoological Gardens of South Africa (or more colloquially known as the Pretoria Zoo), Melrose House Museum in Jacob Maré Street, the Pretoria Art Museum and the African Window Cultural History Museum.

Several National Departments also have Head Offices in the Central Business district such as the Department of Health, Basic Education, Transport, Higher Education and Training, Sport and Recreation, Justice and Constitutional Development, Public Service and Administration, Water and Environmental Affairs and the National Treasury. The district also has a high number of residential buildings which house people who primarily work in the district.

Parks and gardens
Pretoria is home to the National Zoological Gardens of South Africa, as well as the Pretoria National Botanical Garden. There are also a number of smaller parks and gardens located throughout the city, including the Austin Roberts Bird Sanctuary, Pretorius Square gardens, the Pretoria Rosarium, Church Square, Pretoria Showgrounds, Springbok Park, Freedom Park, Jan Cilliers Park and Burgers Park, the oldest park in the city and now a national monument. In the suburbs there are also several parks that are notable: Rietondale Park, "Die Proefplaas" in the Queenswood suburb, Magnolia Dell Park, Nelson Mandela Park and Mandela Park Peace Garden and Belgrave Square Park.

Jacaranda city

Pretoria's nickname "the Jacaranda City" comes from the around 70,000 jacaranda trees that grow in Pretoria and decorate the city each October with their purple blossoms. The first two trees were planted in 1888 in the garden of local gardener, J.D. Cilliers, at Myrtle Lodge on Celliers Street in Sunnyside. He obtained the seedlings from a Cape Town nurseryman who had harvested them in Rio de Janeiro, Brazil. The two trees still stand on the grounds of the Sunnyside Primary School.

The jacaranda comes from tropical South America and belongs to the family Bignoniaceae. There are around fifty species of jacaranda, but the one found most often in the warmer areas of Southern Africa is Jacaranda mimosifolia.

At the end of the 19th century, the flower and tree grower James Clark imported jacaranda seedlings from Australia and began growing them on a large scale. In November 1906, he donated two hundred small saplings to the Pretoria City Council, which planted them on Koch Street (today Bosman Street). The city engineer Walton Jameson, soon known as "Jacaranda Jim", launched a program to plant jacaranda trees throughout Pretoria, and by 1971 there would already be 55,000 of them in the city.

Most jacarandas in Pretoria are lilac in colour, but there are also white ones planted on Herbert Baker Street in Groenkloof.

The Jacaranda Carnival is an old tradition that was held from 1939 to 1964. After a hiatus of over twenty years, it resumed in 1985. Festivities include a colourful march and the crowning of the Jacaranda Queen.

Suburbs

Transportation

Railway
Commuter rail services around Pretoria are operated by Metrorail. The routes, originating from the city centre, extend south to Germiston and Johannesburg, west to Atteridgeville, northwest to Ga-Rankuwa, north to Soshanguve and east to Mamelodi. Via the Pretoria–Maputo railway it is possible to access the port of Maputo, in the east.

The Gautrain high-speed railway line runs from the eastern suburb of Hatfield to Pretoria Station and then southwards to Centurion, Midrand, Marlboro, Sandton, Rhodesfield, OR Tambo International Airport, Rosebank and Johannesburg.

Pretoria Station is a departure point for the Blue Train luxury train. Rovos Rail, a luxury mainline train safari service operates from the colonial-style railway station at Capital Park. The South African Friends of the Rail have recently moved their vintage train trip operations from the Capital Park station to the Hercules station.

Buses
Various bus companies exist in Pretoria, of which PUTCO is one of the oldest and most recognised. Tshwane municipality provides the remainder of the bus services.

Road
The N1 is the major freeway that runs through Pretoria. It enters the city from the south as the Ben Schoeman Highway. At the Brakfontein Interchange in Centurion, the Ben Schoeman Highway becomes the N14 to Pretoria Central, the N1 turns north-east, then north, as the Eastern Bypass, bisecting the large expanse of the eastern suburbs, routing traffic from Johannesburg to Polokwane and the north of the country. The N1 is a toll road. The R101 is the original N1, and served the same function before the construction of the highway. It runs through the centre of city rather than the eastern suburbs.

The N4 enters the city as a highway from eMalahleni in the east, merging with the N1 at the Proefplaas Interchange. It begins again north of the city, branching west from the N1 as the Platinum Highway, forming the Northern Bypass, and heading to Rustenburg. The N4 runs east–west through South Africa, connecting Maputo to Gaborone. The N4 is a toll road. Before the Platinum Highway was built, the N4 continued passed the Proefplaas Interchange to the city centre, where it became a regular road, before again becoming a partially-tolled highway west of the city towards Hartbeespoort. These roads through the city centre are now designated as the M2 (from the Proefplaas Interchange to Arcadia) and the M4 (from Arcadia to Hartbeespoort).

There is a third, original east–west road: the R104, previously named Church Street, also from eMalahleni in the east through Pretoria to Hartbeespoort and Rustenburg in the west. Church Street has been renamed as Stanza Bopape Street from the M16 to Nelson Mandela Drive (M3), Helen Joseph Street from the M3 to Church Square, WF Nkomo Street from Church Square to the R511 and Elias Motswaledi Street from the R511 to Pelindaba.

The N14 starts from the R101 just south of the Pretoria CBD, heading south as the Ben Schoeman Freeway. At the Brakfontein interchange in Centurion, the Ben Schoeman Highway becomes the N1 to Johannesburg, and the N14 continues as the intersecting west-south-western highway towards Krugersdorp. The R114 parallels the N14 from Centurion to Muldersdrift.

The R21 provides a second north–south highway, further east. It starts from the Fountains Interchange south of the city centre, heading south-east to Monument Park, when it becomes a highway and a toll road. It crosses the N1 at the Flying Saucer Interchange and runs north–south towards Ekurhuleni (specifically Kempton Park and Boksburg). Importantly, it links Pretoria with the OR Tambo International Airport in Kempton Park.

The R80 highway is a highway in the north-west of the city. The highway begins in Soshanguve and it terminates just north of the city centre at an intersection with the M1.

Pretoria is also served by many regional roads. The R55 starts at an interchange with the R80, and runs north–south from Pretoria West to Sandton. The R50 starts from the N1 in the south-east of the city, and continues south-east towards Bapsfontein and Delmas. The R511 runs north–south from Randburg towards Brits and barely by-passes Pretoria to the west. The R514 starts from the M1, north of the city centre, and terminates at the R511 in Hartbeespoort. The R513 crosses Pretoria's northern suburbs from east to west. It links Pretoria to Cullinan and Bronkhorstspruit in the east and Hartbeespoort in the west. The R566 takes origin in Pretoria's northern suburbs, connecting Pretoria to Brits. Finally the R573 starts from the R513, just east of the town and heads north-east to KwaMhlanga and Siyabuswa.

Pretoria is also served internally by metropolitan routes.

Airports
Wonderboom Airport in the suburb of Wonderboom in the north of Pretoria primarily services light commercial and private aircraft. However, as from August 2015, scheduled flights from Wonderboom Airport to Cape Town International Airport were made available by SA Airlink. There are two military air bases to the south of the city, Swartkop and Waterkloof.

Culture

Media

Since Pretoria forms part the Tshwane Metropolitan Municipality, most radio, television and paper media is the same as the rest of the metro area.

Radio

There are many radio stations in the greater Pretoria region, some of note are:

Jacaranda FM, previously known as Jacaranda 94.2, is a commercial South African radio station, broadcasting in English and Afrikaans, with a footprint that covers Gauteng, Limpopo, Mpumalanga and the North West Province and boasts a listening audience of 2 million people a week, and a digital community of more than 1,1 million people a month. The station's format is mainstream adult contemporary with programming constructed around a playlist of hit music from the 1980s, 1990s and now.

Tuks FM is the radio station of the University of Pretoria and one of South Africa's community broadcasters. It was one of the first community broadcasters in South Africa to be given an FM licence. It is known for contemporary music and is operated by UP's student base.

Radio Pretoria is a community-based radio station in Pretoria, South Africa, whose programmes are aimed at Afrikaners. It broadcasts 24 hours a day in stereo on 104.2 FM in the greater Pretoria area. Various other transmitters (with their own frequencies) in South Africa broadcast the station's content further afield, while the station is also available on Sentech's digital satellite platform.

Impact Radio, is a Christian Community Radio Station based in Pretoria, and broadcasting on 103FM in the Greater Tshwane Area.

Television
Pretoria is serviced by eTV, SABC, MNET, and SuperSport.

Paper
The city is serviced by a variety of printed publications namely;

Pretoria News is a daily newspaper established in Pretoria in 1898. It publishes a daily edition from Monday to Friday and a Weekend edition on Saturday and Sunday. It is an independent newspaper in the English language that serves the city and its direct environs. It is available online via the Independent online website.

Beeld is an Afrikaans-language daily newspaper that was launched on 16 September 1974. Beeld is distributed in four provinces of South Africa: Gauteng, Mpumalanga, Limpopo, North West. Die Beeld (English: The Image) was an Afrikaans-language Sunday newspaper in the late 1960s.

Pretoria Creole

Pretoria Sotho (called Sepitori by its speakers) is the urban lingua franca of Pretoria and the Tshwane metropolitan area in South Africa. It is a combination of Tswana and Northern Sotho (Pedi), with influences from Tsotsitaal and other black South African languages. It is a creole language that developed in the city during the years of Apartheid.

Museums

 Ditsong National Museum of Cultural History, a.k.a. African Window
 Freedom Park
 Hapo Museum
 Kruger House (residence of the president of the ZAR, Paul Kruger)
 Mapungubwe Museum
 Melrose House (the Treaty of Vereeniging which ended the Anglo-Boer War was signed here in 1902)
 National Library of South Africa
 Pioneer Museum
 Pretoria Art Museum
 Pretoria Forts
 South African Air Force Museum
 Transvaal Museum
 Van Tilburg Collection
 Van Wouw Museum
 Voortrekker Monument
 Willem Prinsloo Agricultural Museum
 Sammy Marks House
 SP Engelbrecht Museum (history of the NHK church)
 Smuts House Museum

Music
A number of popular South African bands and musicians are originally from Pretoria. These include Desmond and the Tutus, Bittereinder, The Black Cat Bones, Seether, popular mostwako rapper JR, Joshua na die Reën and DJ Mujava who was raised in the town of Attridgeville.

The song "Marching to Pretoria" refers to this city. Pretoria was the capital of the South African Republic (a.k.a. Republic of the Transvaal; 1852–1881 and 1884–1902) the principal battleground for the First and Second Boer War, the latter which brought both the Transvaal and the Orange Free State republic under British rule. "Marching to Pretoria" was one of the songs that British soldiers sang as they marched from the Cape Colony, under British Rule since 1814, to the capital of the Southern African Republic (or in Dutch, Zuid-Afrikaansche Republiek). As the song's refrain puts it: "We are marching to Pretoria, Pretoria, Pretoria/We are marching to Pretoria, Pretoria, Hurrah."

The opening line of John Lennon's Beatles' song I Am the Walrus, "I am he as you are he as you are me and we are all together", is often believed to be based on the lyric "I'm with you and you're with me and so we are all together" in "Marching to Pretoria". Lennon denied this, insisting his lyrics came from "nothing".

Performing arts and galleries

Pretoria is home to an extensive portfolio of public art. A diverse and evolving city, Pretoria boasts a vibrant art scene and a variety of works that range from sculptures to murals to pieces by internationally and locally renowned artists. The Pretoria Art Museum is home to a vast collection of local artworks. After a bequest of 17th century Dutch artworks by Lady Michaelis in 1932 the art collection of Pretoria City Council expanded quickly to include South African works by Henk Pierneef, Pieter Wenning, Frans Oerder, Anton van Wouw and Irma Stern. And according to the museum: "As South African museums in Cape Town and Johannesburg already had good collections of 17th, 18th and 19th century European art, it was decided to focus on compiling a representative collection of South African art" making it somewhat unusual compared to its contemporaries.

Pretoria houses several performing arts venues including:
the South African State Theatre which houses the arts of Opera, musicals, plays and comedic performances.

A 9 metre tall statue of former president Nelson Mandela was unveiled in front of the Union Buildings on 16 December 2013. Since Nelson Mandela's inauguration as South Africa's first majority elected president the Union Buildings have come to represent the new 'Rainbow Nation'. Public art in Pretoria has flourished since the 2010 FIFA World Cup with many areas receiving new public artworks.

Sport

One of the most popular sports in Pretoria is rugby union. Loftus Versfeld is home to the Blue Bulls, who compete in the domestic Currie Cup, and also to the Bulls in the international United Rugby Championship competition. The Bulls rugby team, which is operated by the Blue Bulls, won the Super Rugby competition in 2007, 2009 and 2010. Loftus Versfeld also hosts the football side Mamelodi Sundowns.

Pretoria also hosted matches during the 1995 Rugby World Cup. Loftus Versfeld was used for some matches in the 2010 FIFA World Cup.

Association football is one of the most popular sports in the city. There are two football teams in the city playing in South Africa's top-flight football league, the Premier Soccer League. They are Mamelodi Sundowns and Supersport United. Supersport United were the 2008–09 PSL Champions. Following the 2011/2012 season the University of Pretoria F.C. gained promotion to the South African Premier Division, the top domestic league, becoming the third Pretoria-based team in the league. After a poor league finish in the 2015/2016 season, University of Pretoria F.C. were relegated to the National First Division, the second-highest football league in South Africa, in the 2016 Premier Soccer League promotion/relegation play-offs.

Cricket is also a popular game in the city. As there is no international cricket stadium in the city, it does not host any top-class cricket tournaments, although the nearby situated Centurion has Supersport Park which is an international cricket stadium and has hosted many important tournaments such as 2003 Cricket World Cup, 2007 ICC World Twenty20, 2009 IPL and 2009 ICC Champions Trophy. The most local franchise team to Pretoria is the Titans, although Northerns occasionally play in the city in South Africa's provincial competitions. Many Pretoria born cricketers have gone on to play for South Africa, including former international captains AB de Villiers Faf du Plessis.

The Pretoria Transnet Blind Cricket Club is situated in Pretoria and is the biggest Blind Cricket club in South Africa. Their field is at the Transnet Engineering campus on Lynette Street, home of differently disabled cricket. PTBCC has played many successful blind cricket matches with abled bodied teams such as the South African Indoor Cricket Team and TuksCricket Junior Academy. Northerns Blind Cricket is the Provincial body that governs PTBCC and Filefelfia Secondary School. The Northern Blind Cricket team won the 40 over National Blind Cricket tournament that was held in Cape Town in April 2014.

The city's Sun Arena at Times Square hosted the NBA Africa Game 2018.

Places of worship   

 
Among the places of worship, they are predominantly Christian churches and temples : Zion Christian Church, Apostolic Faith Mission of South Africa, Assemblies of God, Baptist Union of Southern Africa (Baptist World Alliance), Methodist Church of Southern Africa (World Methodist Council), Anglican Church of Southern Africa (Anglican Communion), Presbyterian Church of Africa (World Communion of Reformed Churches), Roman Catholic Archdiocese of Pretoria (Catholic Church). There are also Muslim mosques and Hindu temples.

Jewish community

Pretoria has a small Jewish community of around 3,000. Jewish citizens have been in Pretoria since its foundation in the 19th century and played an important role in its industrial and economic growth. A Mr. De Vries, the first Jewish inhabitant of Pretoria, was a prominent citizen and prosecutor, a member of the Volksraad and a pioneer of the Afrikaans language. Another famed Jewish Pretorian was Sammy Marks.

Other early Jewish settlers, many of them immigrants from Lithuania, were not as educated as De Vries and often did not speak Dutch, Afrikaans, or English. Many of them spoke only Yiddish and made a living as shopkeepers in the local retail industry. Most Jewish residents stayed neutral in the Second Boer War, though some joined the South African Republic army.

The first congregation was founded between 1890 and 1895, and in 1898 the first synagogue opened on Paul Kruger Street. A second synagogue, known as the Great Synagogue, opened in 1922. Both synagogues are no longer in operation, but a Reformed synagogue, Temple Menorah, opened in the early 1950s.

The Jewish community of Pretoria's golden age was in the early 20th century, when many Jewish sports clubs, charities, and youth groups flourished. After 1948, many Jews left for Cape Town or Johannesburg.

The synagogue on Paul Kruger Street was purchased by the government in 1952 to become the new home of the High Court where prominent opposition figures in the Anti-Apartheid Movement were tried, including Nelson Mandela, Walter Sisulu, and 26 others were prosecuted for treason from 1 August 1958 to 29 March 1961; the Rivonia Trial was held there in 1963–1964.

Two Jewish schools arose in Pretoria, the Miriam Marks School, which was founded in 1905, and the Carmel School, which opened in 1959. Only the second, currently also operating as a synagogue, remains. Pretoria's Reformed congregation shares a rabbi with the Johannesburg one, though the synagogue no longer operates and services take place in worshippers' private homes.

Buddhist community
A Buddhist center, the Jang Chup Chopel Rigme Centre ("Center of Light") was founded in early January 2015 by Duan Pienaar or Gyalten Nyima (his adopted monastic name) in Waverley around Pretoria-Moot. Pienaar is the only Afrikaner ordained in the highly selective Tibetan Tantric Buddhist community in Bylakuppe, in southern India. His instructor Lama Kyabje Choden Rinpoche is the highest tantric master after the Dalai Lama. Pienaar, who studied Buddhist teachers for twenty years, spent two years in India.

Coat of arms

The Pretoria civic arms, designed by Dr. Frans Engelenburg, were granted by the College of Arms on 7 February 1907. They were registered with the Transvaal Provincial Administration in March 1953 and at the Bureau of Heraldry in May 1968. The Bureau provided new artwork, in a more modern style, in 1989.

The arms were: Gules, on an mimosa tree eradicated proper within an orle of eight bees volant, Or, an inescutcheon Or and thereon a Roman praetor seated proper. In layman's terms: a red shield displaying an uprooted mimosa tree surrounded by a border of eight golden bees, superimposed on the tree is a golden shield depicting a Roman praetor. The tree represented growth, the bees industry, and the praetor (judge) was an heraldic pun on the name.

The crest was a three-towered golden castle; the supporters were an eland and a kudu; and the motto Praestantia praevaleat Pretoria.
The coat of arms have gone out of favour after the City Council amalgamated with its surrounding councils to form the City of Tshwane Metropolitan Municipality.

Education

Primary education
 Crawford College 
 St. Mary's Diocesan School for Girls

Secondary education

 Afrikaanse Hoër Meisieskool
 Afrikaanse Hoër Seunskool
 Christian Brothers' College
 Clapham High School
 Cornwall Hill College
 Crawford College
 The Glen High School
 Hillview High School
 Hoërskool Menlopark
 Hoërskool Oos-Moot
 Hoërskool Overkruin
 Hoërskool Waterkloof
 Hoërskool Wonderboom
 Pretoria Boys High School
 Pretoria Chinese School
 Pretoria High School for Girls
 Pretoria North High School
 Pretoria Secondary School
 Pro Arte Alphen Park
 St. Alban's College
 St. Mary's Diocesan School for Girls
 Tshwane Muslim School
 Tyger Valley College
 Willowridge High School

International schools
École Miriam Makeba (French school)
Deutsche Schule Pretoria (German school)
AISJ-Pretoria

Tertiary education

Pretoria is one of South Africa's leading academic cities and is home to both the largest residential university in South Africa, largest distance education university in South Africa and a research intensive university. The three Universities in the city in order of the year founded are as follows:

University of South Africa

The University of South Africa (commonly referred to as Unisa), founded in 1873 as the University of the Cape of Good Hope, is the largest university on the African continent and attracts a third of all higher education students in South Africa. It spent most of its early history as an examining agency for Oxford and Cambridge universities and as an incubator from which most other universities in South Africa are descended. In 1946 it was given a new role as a distance education university and in 2012 it had a student headcount of over 300,000 students, including African and international students in 130 countries worldwide, making it one of the world's mega universities. Unisa is a dedicated open distance education institution and offers both vocational and academic programmes.

University of Pretoria

The University of Pretoria (commonly referred to as UP, Tuks, or Tukkies) is a multi campus public research university. The university was established in 1908 as the Pretoria campus of the Johannesburg based Transvaal University College and is the fourth South African institution in continuous operation to be awarded university status. Established in 1920, the University of Pretoria Faculty of Veterinary Science is the second oldest veterinary school in Africa and the only veterinary school in South Africa. In 1949 the university launched the first MBA programme outside of North America. Since 1997, the university has produced more research outputs every year than any other institution of higher learning in South Africa, as measured by the Department of Education's accreditation benchmark.

Tshwane University of Technology

The Tshwane University of Technology (commonly referred to as TUT) is a higher education institution, offering vocational oriented diplomas and degrees, and came into being through a merger of Technikon Northern Gauteng, Technikon North-West and Technikon Pretoria. TUT caters for approximately 60,000 students and it has become the largest residential higher education institution in South Africa.

CSIR
The Council for Scientific and Industrial Research (CSIR) is South Africa's central scientific research and development organisation. It was established by an act of parliament in 1945 and is situated on its own campus in the city. It is the largest research and development organisation in Africa and accounts for about 10% of the entire African R&D budget. It has a staff of approximately 3,000 technical and scientific researchers, often working in multi-disciplinary teams. In 2002, Dr. Sibusiso Sibisi was appointed as the president and CEO of the CSIR.

Military

Pretoria has earned a reputation as being the centre of South Africa's Military and is home to several military facilities of the South African National Defence Force:

Military headquarters

Transito Air Force Headquarters

This complex is the headquarters to the South African Air Force.

The Dequar Road Complex

A military complex that houses the following:
 South African Army's Headquarters
 South African Infantry Formation HQ
 A General Support Base
 Support Formation HQ
 Training Formation HQ
 The 102 Field Workshop unit
 The 17 Maintenance Unit
 The S.A.M.S Military Health Department

The Sebokeng Complex

A military complex located on the corner of Patriot Street and Koraalboom Road that houses the following military headquarters:
 South African Army Armour Formation HQ
 South African Army Artillery Formation HQ
 South African Army Intelligence Corps HQ
 South African Army Air Defence Artillery Formation HQ

Military bases

The Dequar Road Base
This base is situated in the suburb of Salvokop and is divided into two parts:
 The Green Magazine (Groen Magazyn) which is the Headquarters to the Transvaalse Staatsartillerie, a reserve artillery regiment of the South African Army
 Magazine Hill which is the regimental Headquarters to the Pretoria Armoured Regiment, a reserve tank regiment of the South African Army

Thaba Tshwane
Thaba Tshwane is a large military area south-west of the Pretoria Central Business District and North of Air Force Base Swartkop. It is the headquarters of several army units-
  Joint Support Base Garrison that is responsible for the town management of Thaba Tshwane
 The Tshwane Regiment, a reserve motorised infantry regiment of the South African Army
 The 18 Light Regiment, a reserve artillery regiment of the South African Army
 The National Ceremonial Guard and Band

The military base also houses the 1 Military Hospital and the Military Police School. Within Thaba Tshwane, a facility known as "TEK Base" exists which houses its own units:
 The SA Army Engineer Formation
 2 Parachute Battalion
 44 Parachute Engineer Regiment
 1 Military Printing Regiment
 4 Survey and Map Regiment

Joint Support Base Wonderboom
The Wonderboom Military Base is located adjacent to the Wonderboom Airport and is the headquarters of the South African Army Signals Formation. It also houses the School of Signals, 1 Signal Regiment, 2 Signal Regiment, 3 Electronic Workshop, 4 Signal Regiment and 5 Signal Regiment.

Military colleges

The South African Air Force College, the South African Military Health Service School for Military Health Training and the South African Army College are situated in the Thaba Tshwane Military Base and are used to train Commissioned and Non-commissioned Officers to perform effectively in combat/command roles in the various branches of the South African National Defence Force. The South African Defence Intelligence College is also located in the Sterrewag Suburb north of Air Force Base Waterkloof.

Air force bases
While technically not within the city limits of Pretoria, Air Force Base Swartkop and Air Force Base Waterkloof are often used for defence related matters within the city. These may include aerial military transport duties within the city, aerospace monitoring and defence as well as VIP transport to and from the city.

Proposed change of name
On 26 May 2005 the South African Geographical Names Council (SAGNC), which is linked to the Directorate of Heritage in the Department of Arts and Culture, approved changing the name of Pretoria to Tshwane, which is already the name of the Metropolitan Municipality in which Pretoria and a number of surrounding cities are located. Although the name change was approved by the SAGNC, it was not approved by the Minister of Arts and Culture, who at the time requested further research on the matter. Should the Minister approve the name change, the name will be published in the Government Gazette, giving the public opportunity to comment on the matter. The Minister can then refer that public response back to the SAGNC before presenting a recommendation before parliament for a vote. Various public interest groups warned that any name change would be challenged in court, should the minister approve it. The long process involved makes a name change less likely.

The Tshwane Metro Council has advertised "Africa's leading capital city" as Tshwane since the SAGNC decision in 2005. This has led to further controversy, however, as the name of the city had not yet been changed, and the council was, at best, acting prematurely. When a complaint was lodged with the Advertising Standards Authority (ASA), it ruled that such advertisements are deliberately misleading and should be withdrawn from all media. Despite the rulings of the ASA, Tshwane Metro Council failed to discontinue their "City of Tshwane" advertisements. As a result, the ASA requested that Tshwane Metro pay for advertisements in which it admits that it has misled the public. After refusing to abide by the ASA's request, the Metro Council was banned from placing any advertisements in the South African media that refer to the capital as Tshwane. ASA may still place additional sanctions on the Metro Council that would prevent it from placing any advertisements in the South African media, including council notices and employment vacancies.

After the ruling, the Metro Council continued to place Tshwane advertisements, but placed them on council-owned advertising boards and busstops throughout the municipal area. In August 2007, an internal memo was leaked to the media in which the Tshwane mayor sought advice from the premier of Gauteng on whether the municipality could be called the "City of Tshwane" instead of just "Tshwane". This could increase confusion about the distinction between the city of Pretoria and the municipality of Tshwane.

In early 2010 it was again rumoured that the South African government would make a decision regarding the name; however, a media briefing regarding name changes, which could have been an opportunity to discuss it, was cancelled shortly before taking place. Rumours of the name change provoked outrage from Afrikaner civil rights and political groups. It later emerged that the registration of the municipality as a geographic place had been published in the government gazette as it had been too late to withdraw the name from the publication, but it was announced that the name had been withdrawn, pending "further work" by officials. The following week, the registration of "Tshwane" was officially withdrawn in the Government Gazette. The retraction had reportedly been ordered at the behest of the Deputy President of South Africa Kgalema Motlanthe, acting on behalf of President Jacob Zuma, as minister of Arts and Culture Lulu Xingwana had acted contrary to the position of the ANC, which is that Pretoria and the municipality are separate entities, which was subsequently articulated by ANC secretary general Gwede Mantashe.

In March 2010 a group supporting the name change, calling themselves the "Tshwane Royal House Committee", claimed to be descendants of Chief Tshwane and demanded to be made part of the administration of the municipality.

According to comments made by Mayor Kgosientso Ramokgopa in late 2011, the change would occur in 2012. However, there remained considerable uncertainty about the issue.

, the proposed name change has not occurred.

International relations

Twin towns – sister cities

Pretoria is twinned with:

 Amman, Jordan
 Baku, Azerbaijan
 Bucharest, Romania
 Bulawayo, Zimbabwe
 Kumasi, Ghana
 Kyiv, Ukraine
 Port Louis, Mauritius
 Taipei, Taiwan
 Tehran, Iran
 Washington, D.C., United States

Notable people 

 Elon Musk, entrepreneur and business magnate
 Anel Alexander, actress
 Carrim Alli, a police captain whose murder made national headlines
 Frances Ames, neurologist, psychiatrist and human rights activist
 Melinda Bam, Miss South Africa 2011
 Johan Barkhuizen, cricketer
 Margaret Becklake, academic and epidemiologist
 Daniel Bekker, athlete
 Deanne Bergsma, dancer
 Conrad Bo, artist
 Roelof Botha, venture capitalist
 Wim Botha, artist
 Rory Byrne, Chief designer at the Benetton and Scuderia Ferrari Formula One teams
 Jan-Henning Campher  Rugby union player
 Sharlto Copley, actor
 Kurt Darren, singer/songwriter 
 Rassie van der Dussen, cricketer
 Damon Galgut, Booker Prize-winning author
 Branden Grace, golfer
 Nigel Green, actor
 George Gristock, Victoria Cross recipient
 Steve Hofmeyr, singer, songwriter and actor
 Bobby van Jaarsveld, South African singer/songwriter
 Glynis Johns, actress
 Gé Korsten, opera tenor and actor
 Anneline Kriel, Miss South Africa 1974 & Miss World 1974
 Paul Kruger, president of the South African Republic
 Thomas Madigage, soccer player
 Tony Maggs, Formula 1 driver
 Vusi Mahlasela, singer/songwriter
 Justice Mahomed, former Chief Justice of South Africa, co-authored the constitution of Namibia
 Magnus Malan, Minister of Defence in the cabinet of President P. W. Botha
 Eugène Marais, lawyer, naturalist, poet and writer
 Sammy Marks, entrepreneur
 Herman Mashaba, the former Mayor of Johannesburg
 Thulasizwe Mbuyane, soccer player
 Karin Melis Mey, athlete
 Marc Milligan, cricketer
 Tim Modise, journalist, TV and radio presenter
 Lucas Moripe, soccer player (Pretoria Callies FC)
 Chris Morris, cricketer
 Michelle Mosalakae, actress and theatre director
 Es'kia Mphahlele, writer, educator, artist and activist celebrated as the Father of African Humanism
 Helene Muller, athlete
 Kimbal Musk, entrepreneur
 Franco Naudé, rugby union player
 Sean Nowak, cricketer
 Micki Pistorius, profiler and author
 Oscar Pistorius, athlete and convicted murderer
 Faf du Plessis, cricketer
 Louis Hendrik Potgieter, member of Dschinghis Khan pop band
 Austin Stevens, herpetologist, wildlife photographer, film maker and author
 Arnold Vosloo, actor
 Casper de Vries, comedian
 Joost van der Westhuizen, rugby union player
 Anton van Wouw, sculptor and artist
 A-Reece, rapper
 Dj Maphorisa, Dj and record producer
 25k, rapper

Places of interest

 Pretoria National Botanical Garden, a botanical garden containing a massive collection of native flora.
 The National Zoological Gardens of South Africa, the premier zoological gardens of South Africa.
 Church Square, the historical governmental centre of the South African Republic.
 Union Buildings, the executive branch of the South African government.
 Mahlamba Ndlopfu, the official residence of the President of South Africa.
 Marabastad, a historical shopping district for non-whites during Apartheid.
 Menlyn Park, shopping area.
 Voortrekker Monument, a historical complex dedicated to the Great Trek.
 Hatfield Square, the main student relaxation district.
 Pretoria railway station, a historical landmark and departure point for metrorail and Gautrain trains.
 Freedom Park, a historical complex dedicated to the end of Apartheid and the fallen soldiers of South Africa after 1994.
 Pretoria Forts, historical bastions designed to protect the city against the British, including a museum on the Boer Wars.
 State Theatre, South Africa, the premier national performing arts complex.
 Government House, Pretoria.

Nature reserves
 Chamberlain Bird Sanctuary
 Faerie Glen Nature Reserve
 Groenkloof Nature Reserve
 Moreletaspruit Nature Reserve
 Rietvlei Nature Reserve
 Roodeplaat Dam Provincial Nature Reserve
 Wonderboom Nature Reserve

See also
Sir Herbert Baker
Houses of Parliament, Cape Town
Pretoria Wireless Users Group—a free, non-profit, community wireless network in Pretoria
Supreme Court of Appeal of South Africa

References

External links

City of Tshwane; Metropolitan Municipality official website

 
1855 in South Africa
Capitals in Africa
Cities in South Africa
Geographical naming disputes
Populated places established in 1855
Populated places founded by Afrikaners
Populated places in the City of Tshwane